"X Gon' Give It to Ya" is a 2002 song by American rapper DMX, released as the lead single from the soundtrack Cradle 2 the Grave. The song is also a hidden track on DMX's greatest hits album, The Definition of X: The Pick of the Litter and is a bonus track on European releases of his then-current album Grand Champ (from whose sessions the song is taken). It was written by DMX and produced by co-soundtrack organizer Shatek. It was his most successful international single.

Commercial performance 
The song found success on the charts, peaking at number 60 on the Billboard Hot 100, number 30 on the Hot R&B/Hip-Hop Songs and number 13 on the Hot Rap Songs. "X Gon' Give It to Ya" later saw a resurgence in popularity following its inclusion in the 2016 film Deadpool, along with prominent spots in its marketing campaign. Following the movie's release, the song bested its 2003 performance on the Hot R&B/Hip-Hop Songs chart with a peak position of number 23, rose 403 percent in sales with 26,000 downloads, and rose 104 percent in streams to 2.6 million US clicks. As of May 2017, the single has officially been certified platinum by the Recording Industry Association of America (RIAA).

Music video 
The song's music video, directed by Joseph Kahn, was nominated for Soundtrack Video of the Year at the 2003 Music Video Production Association Awards.

In popular culture

 The song was featured in the 2003 video game Def Jam Vendetta, in which DMX is also a character.
 "X Gon' Give It to Ya" has been used as the walk-up song of former San Diego Padres outfielder Xavier Nady and Boston Red Sox infielder Xander Bogaerts, as well as the walkout song of MMA fighter Brian Ortega.
 The song was featured in the 9th episode of the Adult Swim television show Rick and Morty named "Something Ricked This Way Comes".
 The song was used in the trailer of The Brave One.
 The song was featured in the 2016 Marvel Comics movie Deadpool, and appears on its official soundtrack. As it became closely associated with the franchise, it briefly played in the sequel, Deadpool 2 (2018).
 The song was featured on the soundtrack of the 2016 video game Forza Horizon 3.
 In early 2019 the song was widely featured in memes and videos associated with the popular character Mr X in the 2019 remake of Resident Evil 2 at the time the game came out on the same day DMX was released from prison on January 25, 2019.
 The song was featured in episode 7 of the seventh season of Shameless.
 A version of the song was used in a Chex commercial titled "Chex Gon' Give It To Ya".
 The song was featured in the third episode of Euphoria.
The song was used in adverts for KFC in the United Kingdom and New Zealand.
The song was used in the gameplay trailer for the 2020 video game CrossfireX.
The song was used in a commercial for the XFL
The song was featured in an episode of Irish TV series The Young Offenders.
The song is played at Yankee Stadium following a Yankees home run.

Charts

Weekly charts

Year-end charts

Certifications

References

External links

2003 singles
2003 songs
DMX (rapper) songs
Ruff Ryders Entertainment singles
Def Jam Recordings singles
Music videos directed by Joseph Kahn
Songs written by DMX (rapper)
Gangsta rap songs
Songs written for films
Songs written by Swizz Beatz
Internet memes introduced in 2019